Rodriguez, officially the Municipality of Rodriguez, formerly known (and still commonly called) as Montalban, is a 1st class municipality in the province of Rizal, Philippines. According to the 2020 census, it has a population of 443,954 people making it the most populous municipality in the country. Pending an affirmation through plebiscite, Republic Act No. 11812 repealed Batas Pambansa Blg. 275 and intend to revert to its original municipal name, Montalban.

It is the northernmost town in the province and comes after San Mateo, Rizal, and Quezon City coming from Metro Manila. It is also the location of the Montalban Gorge that is associated with the Legend of Bernardo Carpio. The gorge forms part of a protected area known as the Pamitinan Protected Landscape.

The municipality borders San Mateo and Antipolo, Rizal on the south, Norzagaray and San Jose Del Monte, Bulacan on the north, Quezon City and Caloocan on the west and General Nakar, Quezon on the east.

Etymology 
The town's former official name of Montalban derives from the Spanish word Monte (Mountain), in reference to the numerous hills found within and surrounding the town. A common name for the municipality up to the present, it was its official name from its founding in 1871 until 1982 when the Batasang Pambansa officially renamed it to Rodriguez under Batas Pambansa Blg. 275 in honor of Eulogio Rodriguez, Sr., a native of the municipality who served as its first municipal president and Senate President.

History 

Based on the 1954 journal History and Cultural Life of Montalban and its Barrios, what would then be the town of Montalban was formerly the barrio Balite which was under the jurisdiction of the town of San Mateo during the Spanish period. The town was then founded by Fr. Eustaquio of Pasig in 1871. On another account, San Mateo, with its large size, was partitioned on April 27, 1871, when Captain General Rafael Izquierdo issued a decree separating the barrios of Balite, Burgos, Marang and Calipahan from San Mateo and formed them into the new municipality of Montalban.

According to the Executive Summary included in the Annual Audit Reports of Rodriguez, Rizal, the municipality of Montalban was founded on June 30, 1871, under the "Acta de Erreccion" or Deed of Foundation. The town was initially part of the province of Manila, while its present-day mountainous eastern portion, according to the Atlas de Filipinas map by the then Manila Observatory director Fr. Jose Algue, S.J., was under the jurisdiction of the District of Morong. The municipality was then incorporated to the newly-created province of Rizal on June 11, 1901, by virtue of Philippine Commission Act No. 137, after having been a part of the defunct province of Manila. Montalban was then consolidated with San Mateo by virtue of Philippine Commission Act No. 942 on October 12, 1903. San Mateo served as the seat of government in line with the economic centralization. Montalban then became an independent municipality again by virtue of Executive Order No. 20 series of 1908 on February 29, 1908.

In 1982, the town was officially renamed to Rodriguez under Batas Pambansa Blg. 275 in honor of the former Senate President and town native Eulogio Rodriguez, Sr.

Proposed cityhood 
As early as 2018, the town's Sangguniang Bayan approved Resolution No. 60, Series of 2018 requesting the Senate of the Philippines thru its president, Vicente Sotto III and the House of Representatives through its speaker, Gloria Macapagal Arroyo to co-sponsor a bill for Rodriguez's conversion into a city.

Proposed reversion of town name to Montalban 

In mid-to-late 2019, before a formal ruling could be enacted, the municipal government under the term of Mayor Dennis Hernandez has started to refer to the town as Montalban. 

Notable examples were the discontinuation of the use of the town name Rodriguez in official documents, office names and correspondences, and the municipal government utilizing a modified municipal seal that indicates the name "Montalban" instead of "Rodriguez". In February 2020, a new municipal seal that bears the year 1871 as the date of establishment was used. 

In April 2020, the municipality celebrated its 149th Foundation Day (Araw ng Montalban); in the previous year April 2019, at the time when 1909 was still the recognized date of establishment, the municipality celebrated its 110th founding anniversary.

In response to the numerous requests from the town's native residents to return the town to its former name, on July 3, 2019 during the 18th Congress, Rizal's 2nd District Representative Juan Fidel Nograles filed House Bill No. 337. The bill was later substituted by HB No. 8899 filed March 5, 2021; it was approved by the House of Representatives on March 17 and was received by the Senate on March 27. It was introduced by Sen. Imee Marcos under Senate Bill No. 2258 on June 1.

In the Senate hearing of the Committee on Local Government on January 21, 2022, the National Historical Commission of the Philippines did not pose any objection on the proposed measure and clarified that the proposed change will only apply to the municipality's name; structures and other features such as buildings, schools in the municipality dedicated in memory of the late Senator Rodriguez are not covered by the proposed bill and should be retained.

With further minor amendments, the bill was approved on third and final reading on January 31. The House adopted the Senate amendment and the bill was submitted to the president for his signature.

On June 2, 2022, Republic Act No. 11812, an act for the reversion of the name of municipality Rodriguez to Montalban and repealing Batas Pambansa Blg. 275, lapsed into law. A plebiscite, having no final schedule yet, will be supervised by the Commission on Elections.

Geography 
Rodriguez is a town of mountains. From its north to south, a series of sloping ridges, hills and mountains ranges adorn the town. In fact, around 27% of the town is occupied by mountains and slopes.

Rodriguez makes up 26.6% of the entire province of Rizal, housing 11 barangays. Rodriguez's economic activities include agriculture and commerce such as the Avilon Zoo.

Elevation and slope 

The Municipality of Rodriguez is generally very rough in topography, with 83% of its total land area composed of upland areas, hills and mountain ranges. The remaining 17% low-lying terrain and rolling lands are found at the south-western portion of the municipality, along with the northern portions of the Municipality of San Mateo.

The rolling slopes comprise the Marikina River Valley, where water from higher elevations drain towards the Marikina River and its tributaries at the south-western portion of the municipality. The western portion of the flatlands gently rises towards the west, which is part of Quezon City.

The mountainous regions of the Municipality of Rodriguez are found at the central and eastern areas, with sleepy sloping ridges and mountain ranges, traversing north to south. The terrain in these mountain ranges has slopes ranging from 30 to 50%. Very steep hills and mountains have slopes greater than 50%. Rolling to hilly areas 18–30% in slope can also be found. These high elevations are drained by the Tanay, Puray, and Rodriguez Rivers.

Barangays 

Rodriguez is politically subdivided into 11 barangays (8 urban, 3 rural) with the barangays of San Isidro and San Jose being two of the most populated barangays in the municipality and in the Philippines.

Climate

Demographics

Economy

Transportation 

The main transportation used in the municipality are jeepneys, tricycles, UV Express, and buses. There are jeepneys that ply through the towns of San Mateo, Marikina and Cubao via Marcos Highway in Quezon City, some ply the route that leads to Philcoa in Quezon City via Batasan Road in San Mateo, others connect Rodriguez to Litex Road in Quezon City. The Marikina Auto Line Transport Corporation (MALTC) buses is the only one that regularly travels to farther places like Makati and Parañaque. UV Express vehicles ply the routes to Cubao in Quezon City and Santa Lucia Grand Mall in Cainta.

Formerly, there was railway service under the Manila Railroad Company that traversed the San Mateo, Marikina, and Pasig areas and had its terminus at Barangay Balitè behind the Santo Rosario Parish Church but it had been long dismantled and the railway line converted into roadway that now consists of the road aptly named Daang Bakal.

It is known that 'patok' jeepneys originated from this town way back during the 1980's. These jeepneys are known for their notoriety on the road. Despite this, they are popular among the passengers hence the name patók which means 'popular'. They still ply this town up to this day, most plying the Montalban-Cubao route via Marcos Highway. These jeepneys have already spread throughout the Rizal province as well as in Marikina since then.

List of local chief executives

Hospitals 
H Vill Hospital
N. Medcare Hospital
St. Mark Hospital
Montalban Infirmary
Casimiro A. Ynares Sr. Memorial Hospital

Education 
There are numerous elementary and high schools, both public and private, offering primary, secondary and tertiary education in the town of Rodriguez. There are also colleges and institutions that offer graduate and undergraduate programs in town.

Tourism
 Pamitinan Protected Landscape
 Wawa Dam
 Puray Falls
 Rodriguez Ancestral Mansion
 Mount Pamitinan and Binacayan
 Mount Hapunang Banoi
 Mount Sipit-Ulang
 Avilon Zoo
 Espadang Bato

Gallery

See also 
 List of renamed cities and municipalities in the Philippines
 San Mateo, Rizal

References

External links 

 Rodriguez Profile at PhilAtlas.com
 [ Philippine Standard Geographic Code]
 Local Governance Performance Management System

 
Municipalities of Rizal
Populated places established in 1909
1909 establishments in the Philippines
Populated places on the Marikina River